Michael Edward Keenan (born October 21, 1949) is a Canadian professional hockey coach who most recently coached the Kunlun Red Star of the Kontinental Hockey League. Previously, he served as head coach and/or general manager with several NHL teams between 1984 and 2009. He currently ranks fifth in playoff wins with 96. He is noted for his early career success in coaching Team Canada to win the 1987 Canada Cup round-robin tournament in a thrilling best-of-three series finale against Viktor Tikhonov's Red Army team.

Keenan won a Stanley Cup championship as coach of the New York Rangers in 1994. He also won the Gagarin Cup while coaching Metallurg Magnitogorsk in 2014, and he is the only head coach to have won championships in both the NHL and KHL.

Coaching career

NHL career
His first coaching job was at Forest Hill Collegiate Institute in Toronto, Ontario, where he coached the varsity hockey team. In 1977 he became the coach of the Oshawa Legionaires of the Metro Junior B Hockey League, where he led them to back-to-back championships in 1979 and 1980. The following year he began his junior coaching career with the Peterborough Petes before moving on to the Rochester Americans, which he guided to the American Hockey League championship in 1983. He returned to the University of Toronto to lead it to the CIAU title. He then landed his first high-profile job with the Philadelphia Flyers in 1984. In 1993, he became the New York Rangers head coach and led the team to its first Stanley Cup win since 1940. Prior to the 1993 season, he was also a candidate for the Detroit Red Wings head coaching job that eventually went to Scotty Bowman.

The 1994 season saw Keenan become the first to coach two teams to a Game 7 in the Stanley Cup Finals, having previously coached the Flyers in a losing effort against the Edmonton Oilers in 1987. In winning the 1994 Stanley Cup, Keenan managed to avoid becoming the first coach in NHL history to lose Game 7s with two teams (the fate which would befall Babcock in losing to the Pittsburgh Penguins).

After leaving the Rangers, Keenan went on to serve as coach and general manager of the St. Louis Blues (1994–96), and coached the Vancouver Canucks (1997–98), and the Boston Bruins (2000–01).   He was named head coach of the Florida Panthers on December 3, 2001, before becoming its general manager. On September 3, 2006, Keenan resigned his position and was replaced by head coach Jacques Martin.

On April 24, 2007, Keenan would take his next role as senior advisor to the Swedish Ice Hockey Association. This role would not last long as he was named head coach of the Calgary Flames on June 14, 2007. Keenan would go on to pass Pat Quinn for 4th on the all time NHL coach win list (648 wins) on February 12, 2009.

Currently, he is 12th all time in National Hockey League wins. Keenan's teams never missed the playoffs until 1998. His tough coaching style and attitude towards his players have earned him the nickname "Iron Mike".

On May 22, 2009, after two consecutive first round playoff losses, Keenan was fired as head coach of the Calgary Flames; he had one year left on his contract. He recorded his 600th win as an NHL coach with the Flames.

As commentator
On October 1, 2009, MSG Network announced that Keenan would join the Rangers MSG Network broadcast team of Sam Rosen, Joe Micheletti, Al Trautwig, John Giannone, Dave Maloney, and Ron Duguay as a regular guest analyst for pre-game, intermission, and post-game reports on the network. He's also an analyst on MSG Hockey Night Live with Trautwig, Duguay, Maloney, Ken Daneyko, and Butch Goring.

KHL career
On May 13, 2013, Keenan signed a contract with Metallurg Magnitogorsk of KHL. On April 30, 2014, Keenan's Metallurg team won the KHL championship with a game seven victory over HC Lev Praha. In winning the team's first Gagarin Cup, Keenan became both the first North American coach to win a KHL championship and the first coach to win both the Gagarin Cup and the Stanley Cup. On October 17, 2015, Keenan was fired by Magnitogorsk.

On March 16, 2017, Keenan was announced as the new head coach of HC Kunlun Red Star, the KHL's first Chinese based team. After a disappointing start to the 2017–2018 season, Keenan was fired by Kunlun Red Star on December 3, 2017.

Controversy
Despite Keenan's coaching record, his inability to maintain working relationships with players and team organizations has resulted in a lack of long-term coaching positions.  His coaching resume includes abrupt terminations or resignations from coaching or general manager positions, sometimes at bafflingly inopportune, or peak, moments of his career.

He was fired from the Philadelphia Flyers a year after leading them to the 1987 Stanley Cup Finals. After taking the Chicago Blackhawks to the 1992 Stanley Cup Finals, Keenan was forced to focus solely on his GM duties when longtime Blackhawk player and assistant coach, Darryl Sutter, was being courted by other teams to be their head coach. Owner Bill Wirtz did not want to lose Sutter, especially since Keenan had stated, in July 1992, that he wished to focus solely on his duties as general manager after the 92–93 season. Keenan lost a power struggle with Senior V.P. Bob Pulford after the 1992–93 season, resigned his position, and was soon hired by the New York Rangers. Keenan managed to coach the Rangers to the Stanley Cup in his first and only year as head coach, but was unable to coexist long enough with general manager Neil Smith and resigned weeks later, citing a violation of his contract by the Rangers.

Stops in St. Louis and Vancouver saw conflict with team stars; both Brett Hull and Trevor Linden had major personality conflicts with Keenan. In one instance while the Blues were playing the Buffalo Sabres at The Aud, Dale Hawerchuk's dying grandmother, who lived in nearby Fort Erie, Ontario, Canada, came to see him play one last time while she was alive. Keenan deliberately benched Hawerchuk for the game, and an unhappy captain Brett Hull screamed at Keenan, who then responded by stripping Hull's captaincy.

Keenan was even willing to publicly criticize Wayne Gretzky after he acquired the superstar in an early 1996 trade with the Los Angeles Kings. Keenan had previously coached Gretzky in Canada Cup play, and his refusal to moderate his attitude and style even when coaching a team full of stars meant his relationship with the league's all-time leading scorer was never particularly warm. Gretzky refused to consider re-signing with St. Louis after during the 1996 off-season and opted instead to finish his playing career with Keenan's former team, the Rangers.

In September 2006, Keenan again attracted headlines when he abruptly resigned as general manager of the Florida Panthers. Keenan's resignation came shortly after he dealt Florida Panthers' franchise goaltender Roberto Luongo along with defenceman Lukas Krajicek and Florida's 2006 sixth-round draft pick (Sergei Shirokov) to the Vancouver Canucks for struggling forward Todd Bertuzzi, goaltender Alex Auld, and defenceman Bryan Allen. It was speculated that Keenan had lost a power struggle with head coach and longtime friend, Jacques Martin, over personnel decisions. Martin succeeded him as general manager upon his resignation.

He was also notorious for pulling or switching his goaltenders, sometimes multiple times in a period. Before the 1987 playoffs, he used Ron Hextall as the regular starting goalie. However, he pulled goaltenders Hextall and Chico Resch a total of five times in a single game (the fifth time to gain a man-advantage in the last minute of play) in game 4 of the first round of the 1987 playoffs. Three years later, he pulled goaltender Greg Millen in favor of Ed Belfour a total of four times in 8 games. That system was discontinued when he became the New York Rangers head coach and used Mike Richter as the regular starting goalie.

Goaltender Roberto Luongo said the following regarding Keenan's penchant for pulling his goaltenders while a member of the Florida Panthers in 2002:

"Not a big deal. [Keenan] does it so much that we expect it. If he's your coach and you're an NHL goalie on the bench, you have to be ready, just in case."

Personal life and family
Keenan has a wife and a daughter.

Derek Keenan, the head coach and general manager of the Saskatchewan Rush of the National Lacrosse League, is Keenan's third cousin. Derek's wife, Wendy, is a sister of Hockey Hall of Famer, Joe Nieuwendyk.

In 2018, Keenan went public with being diagnosed with prostate cancer, and was then undergoing treatment.

Career record
Regular season points (Pts) contained in brackets denote the team's standing after the full season, not the number of points accrued at the time Keenan was fired.

References

External links 
 

1949 births
Boston Bruins coaches
Calgary Flames coaches
Canada men's national ice hockey team coaches
Canadian ice hockey coaches
Canadian ice hockey right wingers
Chicago Blackhawks coaches
Chicago Blackhawks executives
Florida Panthers coaches
Florida Panthers general managers
Ice hockey people from Ontario
Jack Adams Award winners
Living people
New York Rangers coaches
Sportspeople from Clarington
Peterborough Petes coaches
Philadelphia Flyers coaches
Roanoke Valley Rebels players
St. Lawrence Saints men's ice hockey players
St. Louis Blues coaches
St. Louis Blues executives
Stanley Cup champions
Stanley Cup championship-winning head coaches
University of Toronto alumni
Vancouver Canucks coaches